Crud is a fast-paced sport played on a snooker table (or, if unavailable, a billiards table) that is a tradition on military barracks in several countries. While the sport uses a snooker or similar table and it's played with two snooker balls, no cues are used.  

The rules were formalized by the OCL (Official Crud League) with the launch of the first ever competitive crud league. Each game of Crud, following the OCL rules, has 6 individual players. 

Crud was invented by Royal Canadian Air Force fighter pilots during World War II, and it has remained popular among members of the Canadian Armed Forces, the Canadian Coast Guard, the United States Air Force, the United States Navy, the United States Marine Corps, the Australian Army, and the Royal Australian Air Force.

Rules (Official Crud League Rules)
The rules governing the game of Crud are sometimes misunderstood and many variations of the game exist. The most commonly accepted and popular version of the game follows the Official Crud League rules. Crud is played with two balls, the "shooter" ball (typically the white cue ball), and the "object" ball (typically the 8 ball). Each of the players begins with three lives. The last player "alive" (1 or more lives remaining) wins; The game is over when all players but the winner have lost all their lives.

Normally, opposing players are not allowed to physically block the shooter or object balls, or touch or tackle opposing players, but those rules are relaxed in a variation of crud called "Combat Crud".

Game Setup 
Before each game, determine and display player order (commonly using a chalk board, white board, or digital app. published by the Official Crud League). There are numerous methods of selecting player order, the most common being randomized order via the OCL web application. Players must play in order, like baseball's batting order. Anyone caught playing out of turn loses a life. 

Gameplay begins with the serve. The object ball (commonly the eight-ball) is placed on the foot spot (the center dot used in billiards or snooker) of the table. The first player shoots (throws) the shooter ball (commonly the white cue ball) at the object ball (commonly the eight-ball), attempting to strike the object ball.

There will be at least one referee or judge, who is usually positioned next to the middle of the table. In addition, a scorekeeper is sometimes responsible for keeping track of lives lost.

The referee's rulings are final. Arguing with the referee is allowed and is common, but excessive quibbling may be penalized by the loss of a life.

The Serve

The opening event of each round. With the object ball placed on the foot spot, six inches (152mm) from the receiver end of the table, the shooter is given three attempts to hit the Object Ball using any number of bumper bounces. Shooter Ball movement may only be stopped by the Judge or the Shooter. If he/she does not manage to hit the object ball or the object ball does not travel six inches within three attempts, the shooter loses a life.

Neither the defender nor anything on his/her person (i.e. clothing) may touch the object ball once it is set or in motion nor the shooter ball until it has struck the object ball or play has been declared over. An infraction of this rule ends play and the player is assessed a life. (Exception - see shooter ball leaving the table).

Once the shooter ball strikes the object ball, the defender becomes the shooter and the next player in the player order becomes the defender. The previous shooter must vacate the playing area without affecting play in any way.

Any time a life is lost for any reason play stops and is restarted with a serve — the player which lost a life must serve. (Exception: when a player is eliminated from the game (no lives remaining), the next player in the order serves).

Game Play

Once continuous play has commenced (following the serve) with the object ball moving at least six inches, the next shooter picks up the shooter ball from anywhere she can reach it and attempts to strike the object ball before it stops moving. If possible, the shooter will attempt to sink the object ball in one of the available pockets. The shooter may move around the table to grab the shooter ball and may move back and forth to either end to shoot. The shooter may crawl or roll or jump over the table while moving provided that he/she does not touch the object ball in any way (called a Foul). There is no limit to the number of misses/attempts a player can make as long as the object ball remains in motion. The tag line "Keep it Rolling" is commonly used to refer to this rule indicating that players must keep the object ball rolling (in motion) during their turn, or they lose a life.

How Lives are Lost

Side Shots 
The shooter may only make contact with the object ball by throwing the shooter ball from one of the short ends of the table, not from the sides. The validity of a shot at the end of the table is determined by the location of the player's crotch with respect to an imaginary 45° line drawn (or extension of long side imaginary line) from the corners of the table. Failing to be within the end of the table while shooting the shooter ball is a "Side Shot", and the offending player is assessed a life.

Dead Ball 
If the player is unable to hit the object ball with the shooter before the object ball stops moving (dead ball) he/she loses a life. If the object ball is sunk by team A in one of the legal pockets (a kill), a life may be assessed on either the previous shooter or the next shooter on team B, depending on who allowed the object ball to be killed; determination is solely within the discretion of the Judge, but is usually assessed against the player who last held the shooter ball (i.e. if the next shooter has already grabbed the shooter ball, he loses a life - otherwise the previous player on her team loses the life). The shooter ball is then passed to the next player (in this case the next shooter on team B) to serve.

Legal pockets - house rules vary as to which pockets are allowed for kill shots. Sinking the object into the pockets at the same end as the shooter (close corners) being quite easy, variants which allow this turn the game into a more tactical attempt to keep the object ball in the centre of the table. Game which disallow close corners tend to see more violent shots and faster moving balls. Some house rules disallow the side pockets. Toilet paper rolls may be used to block disallowed pockets or if the pockets are open, sinking the object ball into a disallowed pocket costs the shooter a life.

Short Shot 
"No Six" – Whenever the Object Ball is hit, it must travel 6 inches, including bumper bounce, except in the cases of the "Double Kiss, Dead." The Judge will determine the distance of travel based on his judgment of where the Object Ball was last hit. If full travel is less than 6 inches, center-ball to center-ball, the Life is against the last Shooter.

While taunting an opponent is legal, fun, and generally encouraged, players may not physically interfere with each other or either ball (exception - shooter ball leaves the table). Interference calls may result in the referee warning the offender, or assessing the offending blocker a life. Stationary blocking is permitted provided that the player holds onto the table with both hands. Light body checks by the shooter in order to jockey for position are permitted. If the body check is excessive in the eyes of the referee, the shooter may be warned or assessed a life. The level of physical contact between team members may be waived to any level deemed appropriate by the referee in coordination and agreement of both teams involved in the match. The shooter must be given a reasonable opportunity to acquire the shooter ball.

"Blocking" – When blocking has been allowed, the Shooter has the primary right to the table. The Shooter has a right to get to the Shooter Ball without being blocked by the Defender. The Shooter has a right to make a shot. In some cases, the Shooter will need to go around a Defender who is up against the side of the Table. Inadvertent or accidental Blocking, as determined by the Judge, will not be held against the Defender. The Defender's team has blocking rights based on the following:
-- A blocker must hold onto the side portion of the Table. 
-- Once established in a position to block, a blocker may not move his feet to re-establish another position as the Shooter moves around the Defender. If the Shooter moves to the other end of the table, this rule then applies at that end. 
The shooter may run over, under, around or through blockers (knocking them aside) though the judge may rule that excessive violence has been used and penalize the shooter with a life. Blockers may not retaliate against a shooter who uses fair roughness against them and may not move once set in position. The shooters team-mates may not attempt to clear blockers but may assist him by, for example, lifting him over blockers.

Back Shot 
"F.O.D." – Any Foreign Object Debris that falls or spills onto the playing surface. A piece of attached clothing will not constitute F.O.D. unless it touches one of the Balls during play. Whereas it may be necessary for a Shooter to transit the playing surface to retrieve or shoot the Shooter Ball, a player's shoes or feet may not touch the playing surface or bumpers. The Defender may not be on or somehow resting on the playing surface when anticipating a Shooter's play.

Losing Players
When a player loses all three lives, that player must withdraw from the match. Order of play is adjusted accordingly, with play still alternating between the two teams regardless of how many survivors are playing. IE: the last survivor could alternate between several opponent players.
It is customary for the first player out to procure a beverage of choice for the referee as penalty for their lack of finesse in the game. It is also customary for the second player out to procure a beverage for the lineman/scorekeeper (as used in play). The third player should procure a beverage for the scorekeeper if a lineman is employed.

Fouls

"Ball off the Table" 
When the Shooter Ball is shot so vigorously that it causes the object ball to leave the playing surface the shooter loses a life. Exception - if the object ball bounces off anything, including a player, and returns to the table, play continues. No player may intentionally knock the object ball back into play (penalty is a life). Contact with a player must be accidental. In cases of doubt the referee will decide whether contact was accidental or intentional.

When the shooter ball leaves the table, play continues. The shooter must retrieve the shooter ball wherever it is and return to the table to resume play. The defender may not interfere with attempts to retrieve the shooter ball.

Under no circumstances shall anyone make contact with the Referee, Judge, or scorekeeper. Anyone doing so will be assessed a life as the discretion of the referee.

Touching the Object Ball 
Touching the object ball by hand costs a life.

Winning
When all players but one have lost of their lives, the match is over and the player with one or more remaining lives is declared the victor. If the winning player has all three lives intact, said player is also called a Crudmaster.

Combat Crud (aka Combat Mode)
When teams agree to allow full body checking and blocking similar to what one finds in ice hockey (combat crud) aforementioned Foul offences are left out of the game. Players are allowed to knock over other players without any disciplinary repercussions, just as in any contact sport. This version is therefore quite popular among Crud enjoyers.

Variations
There are many variants on these rules, including the degree to which contact is allowed (for example, full contact, no contact, or contact so long as the blocker is stationary). Check the rules posted on the wall at your establishment; however, reading the rules or mouthing the words while reading the rules may cost you a life (local rules vary).

A dominant variation of crud is also played under many names. The most popular version, coined "Running Man" by the Carr family of Rochester, New York, is widely played across the United States. In this variation, the game is played on regular-sized pool tables, but every man is for himself/herself (no teams) and the object ball must be struck from the opposite end of the table, any balls shot from the sides of the table are deemed "sidewinders" and result in a loss of life. All six pockets are in play. The game has also spread under the name "Balls" and may be played with two opponents (singles), three opponents in free-for-all (triples) or with two teams of two (doubles). If the game is played in doubles, the teams are diagonal players, who usually remain stationary. Games play up to 11 points (win by two) assessed to an entire team instead of lives assessed to individual players. In singles or doubles, a team scores a point when the ball dies while in the possession of the other team (a sunk ball is dead). In doubles, either team member may strike during a team's possession. In triples, points are strikes assigned to the next player in the striking order (when any of the three players has at least 11 strikes and two more than either of the other players, they are eliminated and the game follows doubles rules). Service is always provided by the team who did not gain a point on the previous play, except in the case of an imminent loss (next point would be a loss). The striker ball leaving the table is not a foul, and the game remains in play.

Shuck
Shuck utilizes the same two-ball system and many of the rules of crud, but does not employ a referee – it is geared towards casual home and bar play. Rules not mentioned below are generally acquired from crud.

Basic concept: Two teams of two players each. Unlike crud, there is no rotation of turns, instead all 4 players are involved in every point and either player on a team can grab the cue ball during the play of a point, but no player can ever reach over the center of the table to grab the cue ball; one team may shoot several times in a row. First team to 11 points wins, losing team takes a shot. The opening serve comes from either player on the serving team. The server gets only two attempts to hit "the object ball" otherwise the opposing team receives a point and control of the serve. The cue ball must be rolled (not thrown) and either it or the object ball must hit a wall or be on pace to hit a wall following the serve for it not to be called a fault. The team that scored a point on the prior play always takes the next serve.

Scoring: Once the object ball is moving it is like a "time-bomb" in the sense that when it stops moving the location of the cue ball on the table will (may) determine the winner of the point, i.e. if the cue ball is on your side of table when the object ball stops moving, you lose the point. The only variation to this is the "Gentleman's Rule" (see below).

Making the ball: You score a point by making the object ball in one of the two corner pockets on your opponent's (i.e., the opposite) side of the table or by banking the ball into a side pocket or back into one of your own pockets. If, upon striking the object ball, it goes either directly into a side pocket or the pockets on your own side of the table then you lose the point (note: toilet paper to block the side pockets is an acceptable variation). If the cue ball goes into ANY pocket on your throw, you lose the point—with one exception, the shuck, explained below.

Gentleman's rule: If the ball is coming to a stop and you throw (roll) the cue ball at it but miss and the ball stops, it does not matter what side of the table the cue ball is on, you still lose the point because you missed it (it's pretty obvious when it happens – no complaining allowed). Also part of the Gentleman's Rule is that you cannot just simply roll/push the cue ball onto your opponent's side when the ball is slowing to a stop. This rule is both as complicated as it is critical to the gameplay, and those attempting to play may not quite understand it at first but it will become obvious soon after playing a couple of rounds (think "I Know It When I See It" from Supreme Court Justice Potter Stewart's opinion in the landmark 1964 case involving what should or should not be considered obscene—you'll just know it).

Shuck: A rare and gutsy play for advanced players. If your opponent strikes the object ball and you believe it is going into your pocket (or banking into a side pocket or their own pocket), you can take the cue ball and "shuck" it at your opponent's corner pockets. If you sink the cue ball in their pocket before the object ball falls into a pocket, you have essentially stolen the point away from your opponent. Of course, if you attempt a shuck and sink the cue ball, but the object ball does not fall into a pocket then you lose the point. The Gentleman's rule is also employed if the object ball stops just short of a pocket as your shuck with the cue ball misses (i.e., you would still lose the point).

H-O-R-S-E
A more simple, popular variation is called H-O-R-S-E (or horse pool) or P-I-G (or pig pool), building on the rules of Tim. Like the H-O-R-S-E variation of basketball, each player has five lives (represented by letters of H-O-R-S-E). Like Tim, it is played on a six-pocket pool table, as individuals, and is particularly challenging because all shots must be released from the table end opposite the object ball.

The defender of a served the ball is called the server. The server rolls the object ball horizontally from the shooter, from one side to the other. The server must roll the ball on the opposite end of the table between the first and third dot, from either the left or the right side of the shooter. A mis-serve is any ball rolled by the Server that goes out of the bounds of the first and third dot. Three mis-serves in a row results in a letter for the server.

The shooter has three tries to hit the ball. If the ball is not tapped, the shooter gets a letter. If the ball is released from the near side of the table to the object ball, the shooter gets a letter. If the ball goes in a pocket, the next person in order gets a letter.

Nobody gets a letter if the object ball goes in a pocket on a serve. This is called T-N-A. The Shooter may only T-N-A twice in a row; the third T-N-A results in a letter to the shooter.

There is not a no six rule in H-O-R-S-E; the player is allowed to stop the object ball dead, if it is possible, resulting in a letter for the next player. The double-kiss rule is replaced with a double-tap rule, which reverses the order of play. A shooter who performs a double-tap does not play again; the player who was in order before that player must now play. The new order persists after play stops. (A double-tap does nothing in a two-person game.)

Walking the table is never permitted, and the shooter must have at least one foot on the ground when shooting. There may or may not be a referee. The player who gains the last letter becomes the shooter, and the winner of a game becomes the shooter of the next game and may choose to start play in forward or in reverse order.

References

Games of physical skill
Finger billiards
Royal Canadian Air Force